Daniil Gennadyevich Bolshunov (born 3 April 1997) is a Russian football player who plays for FC Sakhalin Yuzhno-Sakhalinsk.

Club career
He made his debut in the Russian Professional Football League for FC Yakutiya Yakutsk on 19 July 2015 in a game against FC Novokuznetsk.

He made his Russian Premier League debut for FC Tom Tomsk on 3 March 2017 in a game against FC Rostov.

References

External links
 

1997 births
Sportspeople from Tolyatti
Living people
Russian footballers
Association football midfielders
FC Tom Tomsk players
FC Sakhalin Yuzhno-Sakhalinsk players
FC Dynamo Stavropol players
Russian Premier League players